American Ninja 3:  Blood Hunt is a 1989 American martial arts action film directed by Cedric Sundstrom and starring David Bradley. It is based on a story by Gary Conway. A sequel to American Ninja 2: The Confrontation (1987), it is the third  installment in the American Ninja franchise, followed by American Ninja 4: The Annihilation (1991).

Plot
A powerful terrorist known as "The Cobra", has infected Sean Davidson, the American Ninja, with a deadly virus as human guinea pigs in his biological warfare experiments. Sean and his partners Curtis Jackson and Dexter have no choice but to fight The Cobra and his army of genetically-engineered ninja clones led by the female ninja Chan Lee.

Cast

 David Bradley as Sean Davidson
Stephen Webber as Young Sean Davidson
 Steve James as Sergeant Curtis Jackson
 Marjoe Gortner as "The Cobra"
 Michele B. Chan as Chan Lee
 Yehuda Efroni as General Andreas
 Calvin Jung as Izumo
 Evan J. Klisser as Dexter
 Grant Preston as Minister of Interior
 Mike Huff as Dr. Holger
 Alan Swerdlow as Police Captain
 Thapelo Mofokeng as Police Sergeant
 Eckard Rabe as Sean's Father 
 John Barrett as Joe Simpson (uncredited)
 Mike Stone as Tournament Arbiter (uncredited)

Production

Filming
The film, shot in South Africa (not mentioned on the credits), was the first in the American Ninja series to feature a lead actor other than Michael Dudikoff (playing Joe Armstrong in the first two American Ninja movies as well as in American Ninja 4: The Annihilation together with David Bradley's character Sean Davidson); Bradley was cast after Kurt McKinney turned down the offer.

Release

Home media
American Ninja 3: Blood Hunt was released on home video in the United Kingdom by Pathé in September 1989.

Reception

Critical response
It was received poorly by critics. "Cart." of Variety described the film as a "cheap-looking pic" and "Even for this level of by-the-numbers action filmmaking, Cedric Sundtrom script is incredibly lame and his staging of chop-socky violence is little better."

References

External links
 
 
 

1989 films
1989 martial arts films
American martial arts films
American action films
American sequel films
1980s English-language films
Films shot in South Africa
Films scored by George S. Clinton
Ninja films
Golan-Globus films
American Ninja
1980s American films